KGMN (100.1 FM, "Super Country 100.1") is a radio station licensed to serve Kingman, Bullhead City and Lake Havasu City, Arizona.  The station is owned by New West Broadcasting Systems, Inc., owned by Arizona State Mine Inspector Joe Hart and his wife Rhonda. The Harts purchased KGMN in 1984, when it was airing a rock format. It airs a country music format.

The station was assigned the KGMN call letters by the Federal Communications Commission on January 30, 1984.

Booster and translator

References

External links
 KGMN official website

GMN
Country radio stations in the United States
Kingman, Arizona
Mass media in Mohave County, Arizona